Gibbulinella is a genus of air-breathing land snails, terrestrial pulmonate gastropod mollusks in the family Streptaxidae.

Distribution 
The distribution of the genus Gibbulinella includes:
 the Canary Islands

Species

Species within the genus Gibbulinella include
Gibbulinella dealbata (Webb & Berthelot, 1833) 
Gibbulinella dewinteri Bank, Groh & Ripken, 2002
Gibbulinella macrogira (Mousson, 1872)

References

External links 

Streptaxidae